Pulandian District is one of the seven districts under the administration of Dalian, located in the south of Liaoning province, People's Republic of China. The district borders the prefecture-level city of Yingkou to the north.

Geography
Pulandian District is located in the northern part of Dalian on the Liaodong Peninsula. It covers an area of 6968 square kilometers. It borders Zhuanghe to the east, Wafangdian to the west, Jinzhou District to the south and Greater Yingkou to the north. Its area is 2923 square kilometres.

Pulandian has a long coast line on the Yellow Sea in its southeastern part and a short coastline on the Bohai Sea in its southwestern part.

Administrative divisions
There are 18 subdistricts  under the district's administration.

Subdistricts:

Climate

Demography
Pulandian has a population of 915,595.(est. 2015)

Economy
Pulandian's industries are agriculture, fishing and the three main manufacturing industries: fabrics, electric machinery and food.

Transportation
 Harbin-Shenyang-Dalian Railway
 Harbin-Shenyang-Dalian High Speed Railway (to be completed in 2013)
 Shenyang-Dalian Expressway

References

External links
Pulandian Government website
Dalian Government website

Districts of Dalian